Halavan (also Romanized as Halāvan; also known as Halāvān-e Sarney) is a village in Karian Rural District, in the Central District of Minab County, Hormozgan Province, Iran. At the 2006 census, its population was 54, in 8 families.

References 

Populated places in Minab County